Emma Harries (born 29 March 2002) is an English professional footballer who plays as a striker for FA WSL club Reading.

Early life 
Harries was born in England. Harries joined Reading's academy at age 8 and began playing for the U-9's team and remained at the academy until she got promoted to the first team.

Club career 
Harries made her senior debut on 4 October 2020 coming on in the 80th minute, replacing Amalie Eikeland in a win against West Ham. On 27 January 2021, Harries signed her first professional contract, signing a two and a half year contract at Reading. Upon signing she said "I am delighted to have signed my first professional contract, after being at the club for over ten years. It is an extremely proud moment for both myself and my family".

Harries scored her first professional goal in a FA Women's Super League fixture against Bristol City in 2021.

International career

Youth 
Harries got called up to England U17 to play in the 2019 Euro championships qualifiers against Georgia and Hungary. She played both games and scored two goals against Georgia.

Harries has been selected for every England youth age group. She is Vice-Captain of the England U19 team.

Career statistics

Club

References

External links 
 

2002 births
Living people
Reading F.C. Women players
English women's footballers
Women's association football forwards
England women's youth international footballers